Looking on The Bright Side is a 1932 British musical comedy film   It was directed by Graham Cutts and Basil Dean and starring Gracie Fields, Richard Dolman and Julian Rose.

Plot summary
Gracie (Fields) and Laurie (Dolman) are lovers who together form a musical act. Gracie sings and Laurie writes the songs, but when Laurie gets a taste of fame, he runs off after a glamorous actress.

Cast
 Gracie Fields as Gracie
 Richard Dolman as Laurie
 Julian Rose  as Oscar Schultz 
 Wyn Richmond as Josie Joy 
 Tony De Lungo as Delmonico 
 Betty Shale as Hetty Hunt
 Viola Compton as Police Sergeant 
 Bettina Montahners as Bettina 
 Charles Farrell as Released criminal

Home media
The film was released on DVD as part of the Gracie Fields collector's edition which, in addition to this film, includes the films Sally in Our Alley (1931), Love, Life and Laughter (1934), Sing As We Go (1934), Look Up and Laugh (1935), Queen of Hearts (1936) and The Show Goes On (1937), these are on 4 discs. Two films each on three of the discs with the other film on disc four.

Bibliography
 Low, Rachael. Filmmaking in 1930s Britain. George Allen & Unwin, 1985.
 Perry, George. Forever Ealing. Pavilion Books, 1994.

References

External links
Looking on the Bright Side at IMDB

1932 films
1930s romance films
1932 musical comedy films
British musical comedy films
British romance films
Films directed by Basil Dean
Films directed by Graham Cutts
Films set in England
Associated Talking Pictures
British black-and-white films
1930s English-language films
1930s British films